Patriots Day is a 2016 American action drama film about the Boston Marathon bombings in 2013 and the subsequent terrorist manhunt. Directed by Peter Berg and written by Berg, Matt Cook, and Joshua Zetumer, the film is based on the book Boston Strong by Casey Sherman and Dave Wedge. It stars Mark Wahlberg, Kevin Bacon, John Goodman, J. K. Simmons, and Michelle Monaghan. It marks the third collaboration between Berg and Wahlberg, following Lone Survivor and Deepwater Horizon.

Principal photography began on March 29, 2016, in New York City, and also filmed in Boston, Los Angeles, New Orleans, and Philadelphia. The film premiered on November 17, 2016, at the AFI Fest. Distributed by CBS Films via Lionsgate, It was released in Boston, New York and Los Angeles on December 21, 2016, followed by a nationwide expansion on January 13, 2017. It received positive reviews for Berg's direction and the performances of its cast, and was chosen by the National Board of Review as one of the top ten films of 2016.

The title refers to Patriots' Day, the Massachusetts state holiday on which the Boston Marathon is held.

Plot
On April 14, 2013, Boston Police Department Sergeant Tommy Saunders captures a suspect and fails to convince Commissioner Davis to let him off from a punishment duty the next day, working the Boston Marathon. During the marathon, brothers Dzhokhar and Tamerlan Tsarnaev detonate two bombs, causing widespread panic. 

A young couple Patrick Downes and Jessica Kensky are injured and taken to separate hospitals, where they are both required to have one leg amputated. Steve Woolfenden, a family man, is also injured and separated from his toddler son, Leo, who is taken by an officer to a safe location.

FBI Special Agent in Charge Richard DesLauriers is assigned to investigate the bombings in collaboration with Boston police commissioner Ed Davis, while Tommy searches for evidence and helps people that have been injured or separated from their loved ones in the chaos, including Patrick, Jessica, Steven, and Leo. 

FBI analysts review footage of the bombing and identify Dzhokhar and Tamerlan as suspects, but DesLauriers is reluctant to release their pictures to the public without further evidence. His hand is forced when the pictures are leaked to the press, while Watertown Police Sergeant Jeffrey Pugliese's men begin conducting door-to-door searches for the pair.

The Tsarnaev brothers kill Massachusetts Institute of Technology Police Department officer Sean Collier in a failed attempt to steal his pistol, and then carjack student Dun "Danny" Meng, telling him that they committed the marathon bombing and planned to conduct another one in New York City.

While Dzhokhar is in the Shell Gas station convenience store, Meng escapes from the vehicle and takes refuge at the Mobil gas station across the street, where he alerts the police on the whereabouts of the brothers after they drive away in the stolen car. Tommy arrives at the scene, learns of the brothers' plan, and is given the stolen car's GPS tracking number, leading police to the pair, which leads to an armed confrontation.

Several officers are injured in the ensuing shootout, where the brothers use both firearms and bombs. While Tamerlan is shooting, Pugliese shoots his ankle, hindering his ability to gather more explosives. Tamerlan orders Dzhokhar to run to New York City to continue the rampage while he makes a last stand. As Tamerlan is subdued by the police, Dzhokhar runs over his brother in his flight, killing him, and escapes in the chaos.

Meanwhile, Tamerlan's wife Katherine Russell and Dzhokhar's college friends from UMass Dartmouth (Dias Kadyrbayev, Azamat Tazhayakov, and Robel Phillipos) are detained by the FBI Hostage Rescue Team and questioned by the High-Value Interrogation Group. Russell refuses to disclose any knowledge of her husband's illegal activities, paraphrasing the Quran in defiance, while Dzhokhar's roommates appear oblivious to his plans, despite having earlier found bomb components in his possessions.

Later in Watertown, local resident David Henneberry realizes Dzhokhar is hiding in the covered boat in his back yard and calls Tommy and Superintendent William Evans. Dzhokhar is quickly surrounded and arrested after a brief standoff. Crowds cheer in the streets of surrounding neighborhoods while Tommy and his colleagues celebrate. The Boston police are invited to attend a Boston Red Sox game, where David Ortiz thanks them for their heroism and tells them to "stay strong".

The epilogue reveals that Dzhokhar was sentenced to death by lethal injection and is awaiting his appeal in federal prison; his three college friends were arrested for obstructing the bombing investigation and authorities are continuing to seek information regarding Russell's possible involvement in the bombings.

Cast 
 Mark Wahlberg as Boston Police Department Sergeant Tommy Saunders (based on Sergeant Detective Danny Keeler)
 Kevin Bacon as Richard DesLauriers, Special Agent in Charge of the FBI Boston field office
 John Goodman as Boston Police Commissioner Ed Davis
 J. K. Simmons as Watertown Police Sergeant Jeffrey Pugliese
 Michelle Monaghan as Carol Saunders, Tommy's wife and registered nurse
 Alex Wolff as Dzhokhar Tsarnaev
 Themo Melikidze as Tamerlan Tsarnaev
 Michael Beach as Governor of Massachusetts Deval Patrick
 Vincent Curatola as Boston Mayor Thomas Menino
 James Colby as Boston Police Superintendent William Evans
 Jake Picking as Massachusetts Institute of Technology Police Department Officer Sean Collier, who was killed by the Tsarnaev brothers 79 hours after the bombings
 Melissa Benoist as Katherine Russell, Tamerlan Tsarnaev's widow
 Lana Condor as Li, Sean Collier's girlfriend and an MIT student
 Jimmy O. Yang as Dun "Danny" Meng, the driver the Tsarnaevs carjacked 80 hours after the bombings, who escaped at a gas station
 Christopher O'Shea as Patrick Downes, who lost his leg in the bombings 
 Rachel Brosnahan as Jessica Kensky, who also lost her leg in the bombings 
 Khandi Alexander as Veronica the Interrogator
 David Ortiz as himself
 Cliff Moylan as Watertown Sergeant John MacLellan
 Curtis J. Bellafiore as Watertown Officer Joey Reynolds
 Sean Avery as Watertown Officer on Franklin Street
 Elijah Guo as Dias Kadyrbayev, Dzhokhar's UMass Dartmouth Friend
 Token as Andrew Dwinells, Dzhokhar's UMass Dartmouth Roommate
 Joseph Thibodeau as Boston Police Lieutenant, multiple scenes (arrest of man in lobster costume, Black Falcon Terminal, and Doyle's Restaurant and Pub in Jamaica Plain)
 Victoria Avery as Injured Bombing Victim, Boylston Street Finish Line

This film also includes a cameo appearance of the real Dun Meng inside a pizza restaurant in Malden, Massachusetts, as well as the real David Henneberry, who was outside for a short time on a house porch during the search for the bomber. Ken Casey, singer and bassist for Dropkick Murphys, also has a cameo as a man on a porch during a scene of the firefight. And finally, the real Watertown Sgt. MacLellan makes an appearance for a fraction of a second among other Mass Law State officials as they cheer when the younger bomber is captured.

Production

Development 
The film was one of three originally proposed about the bombings, the other two being Boston Strong (based on the book of the same title), set to be directed by Daniel Espinosa and starring Casey Affleck; and Stronger, about bombing victim Jeff Bauman, starring Jake Gyllenhaal. It was to depict Boston Police Commissioner Ed Davis' experiences during the manhunt. CBS Films purchased the rights to Boston Strong and merged it into the existing script. Stronger was produced separately and released on September 22, 2017.

On March 31, 2015, CBS Films announced it was producing the film as Patriots' Day, depicting the 2013 Boston Marathon bombing and manhunt. The script, written by Matt Charman, focused on Boston Police Commissioner Edward F. Davis. The film is also based on the book Boston Strong and material from 60 Minutes. Its final version, not focused specifically on Davis, was written by Peter Berg, Matt Cook, and Joshua Zetumer; Mark Wahlberg plays police officer Sgt. Tommy Saunders and Michelle Monaghan plays his wife Carol. Wahlberg produced the film along with Scott Stuber, Dylan Clark, Stephen Levinson, Michael Radutzky, Hutch Parker and Dorothy Aufiero. By February 2016, the apostrophe in the title was dropped, making it Patriots Day. Also by then, J. K. Simmons had joined the cast as Watertown PD Sgt. Jeffrey Pugliese.

CBS Films and Lionsgate co-financed the film, with Lionsgate handling distribution. On March 8, 2016, Jimmy O. Yang joined the film's cast as Dun Meng, who was carjacked by the Tsarnaev brothers. On the same day, Vincent Curatola was cast as the mayor of Boston, Thomas Menino, who was serving his fifth term when the bombings took place. On March 11, 2016, John Goodman signed on to play former Boston Police Commissioner Ed Davis. On March 25, 2016, James Colby joined the film to play William B. Evans, a Boston PD superintendent, and following him, Michelle Monaghan joined to play Carol Saunders, Tommy's wife. On March 31, Kevin Bacon joined the cast as FBI agent Rick Deslauriers, and on April 4, 2016, Alex Wolff and  Themo Melikidze were cast in the film as Dzhokhar and Tamerlan Tsarnaev, responsible for the bombing and later manhunt. Michael Beach later joined the film to play Massachusetts governor Deval Patrick.

On April 6, 2016, Rachel Brosnahan and Christopher O'Shea joined the film to play newlyweds Jessica Kensky and Patrick Downes, who were at the finish line and seriously injured. The next day, Lana Condor was cast as Sean Collier's prospective girlfriend. On May 5, 2016, Melissa Benoist was cast as Katherine Russell, the widow of Tamerlan Tsarnaev, with Khandi Alexander set to play law enforcement interrogator Veronica, and Jake Picking as MIT Police Officer Sean Collier, who was killed 79 hours after the bombing. David Ortiz, who retired from the Boston Red Sox after the 2016 season, appears as himself.

Filming 
Principal photography began on March 29, 2016, and was conducted in New York City; Boston; Quincy, Massachusetts; Los Angeles; New Orleans; and Philadelphia, with production offices and a soundstage set up in one of the Centennial Park warehouses in Peabody, Massachusetts.  All interior scenes at the FBI warehouse headquarters, as well as exterior 'command tent' scenes, were shot there. Filming was arranged on Laurel Street in Watertown to recreate the shootout that took place there between police and the Tsarnaev brothers; but after objections by residents, town officials denied permission for the location. The City of Malden was approached to stand in for Laurel Street, and ended up with eight locations in the film. Producers then approached University of Massachusetts Dartmouth for permission to shoot scenes at the campus, but the request was denied by chancellor Gerry Kavanaugh. Simmons College stood in for exterior shots of UMass Dartmouth.

The Massachusetts Institute of Technology, where the Tsarnaev brothers killed MIT Police Officer Sean Collier, allowed the film production to shoot "entirely peaceful scenes" on the campus for three days in June. Filming also took place at Collier's actual house. The marathon finish line on Boylston Street was duplicated at the Naval Air Station South Weymouth, in addition to scenes filmed at the actual finish line on the day of the 2016 marathon. Dzhokhar's capture was filmed in Framingham, Massachusetts, on the bombing's third anniversary. Additional filming took place at Doyle's Cafe in Jamaica Plain on April 14, 2016, Watertown, Massachusetts, for shots of the police station and the sequence depicting Dun Meng escaping to the Mobil Gas station unlike the surveillance footage which was shot in Cambridge, Massachusetts, and at Lasell College in Newton, Massachusetts, on May 18, 2016.

Music 

Academy Award-winning composers and Nine Inch Nails members Trent Reznor and Atticus Ross were hired to write the musical score for the film.

"Forever (2007 version)" by Dropkick Murphys plays during the closing credits of the film; however, it is not included on the film's soundtrack.

Release 
Patriots Day premiered on the closing night of the AFI Fest on November 17, 2016. It had a red carpet premiere at the Boch Centre Wang Theatre on December 14, 2016. The film was released in New York, Boston, Los Angeles, New Orleans, Philadelphia, Sofia, Bulgaria, and Paris, France, on December 21, 2016, followed by a wide release on January 13, 2017.

Reception

Box office
Patriots Day grossed $31.9 million in the United States and Canada and $20.2 million in other territories for a worldwide total of $52.2 million, against a production budget of $45 million.

In North America, the film had its expansion alongside the openings of Monster Trucks, The Bye Bye Man, and Sleepless, as well as the wide expansions of Silence and Live by Night, and was expected to gross $18–20 million from 3,120 theaters in its four-day MLK opening weekend. It made $560,000 from Thursday night previews, less than the $860,000 made by Berg and Wahlberg's Deepwater Horizon in September. The film ended up opening to $12.9 million (a four-day total of $14.2 million), finishing below expectations and 6th at the box office.

Critical response

On review aggregator Rotten Tomatoes, the film holds an approval rating of 81% based on 236 reviews, with an average rating of 6.9/10. The website's critical consensus reads, "Patriots Day offers a stirring, solidly crafted tribute to the heroes of a real-life American tragedy without straying into exploitative action thriller territory." On Metacritic, the film has a weighted average score of 69 out of 100, based on 42 critics, indicating "generally favorable reviews". Audiences polled by CinemaScore gave the film an average grade of "A+" on an A+ to F scale.

Kyle Smith of the New York Post called it: "A great American movie about the greatness of ordinary Americans, Patriots Day combines an electrifying manhunt with the intimacy and feel for character writer-director Peter Berg showed in his brilliant TV series Friday Night Lights." Peter Debruge of Variety wrote: "It’s genuinely exciting megaplex entertainment, informed by extensive research, featuring bona fide movie stars, and staged with equal degrees of professionalism and respect."

Reception from the Boston area
Though the film has mostly garnered approval among critics, many Boston-based publications criticized it for glamorizing the events it was based upon, and for the film's focus on Wahlberg's fictional character. In his review for The Boston Globe, Ty Burr wrote: "It’s professionally made, slickly heartfelt, and is offered up as an act of civic healing. At best, it’s unnecessary. At worst, it’s vaguely insulting", and when further referencing local moviegoer's reaction to Wahlberg's heroic but fictional Tommy Saunders character, he simply stated, "We don’t really want to see people who weren’t there. Especially when they’re everywhere". Writing for Esquire, Boston-based critic Luke O'Neil also criticized Wahlberg's character, stating: "For all his talk of honoring his people, Wahlberg seems content to rely on the most hackneyed of Masshole signifiers in their portrayal." Conversely, The Boston Herald gave the film a positive review.

In response, Peter Berg stated that some people automatically disliked the film as they may have been in close proximity to the Boston bombings or they believed the film was made too quickly after the events had occurred. Katharine Q. Seelye, who was not from Boston, wrote in The New York Times that the Saunders character was "[t]he biggest point of divergence", as Boston-area residents disliked the composite character's involvement in all the major events when he was not a single actual person, while people not from the Boston area "may even appreciate [Saunders] as a narrative device" and "have not really questioned" Saunders's role. She concluded "that moviegoers outside New England pretty much accept the film on its own terms, as entertainment, and Bostonians do not."

Accolades
The National Board of Review honored Mark Wahlberg and Peter Berg with their Spotlight Award for this film (and also for Deepwater Horizon).

See also 
 Dark Night

References

External links 
 
 
 
 Patriots Day at History vs. Hollywood

2016 films
2016 crime drama films
2016 action thriller films
2016 thriller drama films
American crime drama films
American crime thriller films
American action thriller films
2010s English-language films
CBS Films films
Drama films based on actual events
Thriller films based on actual events
Crime films based on actual events
Action films based on actual events
Fictional portrayals of the Boston Police Department
Films directed by Peter Berg
Films produced by Scott Stuber
Films produced by Mark Wahlberg
Films shot in Boston
Films shot in Massachusetts
Films set in 2013
Films set in Boston
Films set in Massachusetts
Lionsgate films
Films scored by Trent Reznor
Films scored by Atticus Ross
Films with screenplays by Peter Berg
Films about the Federal Bureau of Investigation
Films about terrorism in the United States
Works about the Boston Marathon bombing
2010s American films